The Poet Laureate of Ohio is the poet laureate for the U.S. state of Ohio. In 2014, Ohio enacted law creating the position of Ohio poet laureate starting July 1, 2016. The Ohio Arts Council provides a list of candidates to the governor for selection to serve a two-year term, with the possibility of reappointment.

List of Poets Laureate

The following have held the position: 

Amit Majmudar (2016-2017)
Dave Lucas (2018-2020)
Kari Gunter-Seymour (2020-present)

External links
Poets Laureate of Ohio at the Library of Congress
Ohio Arts Council Poet Laureate Program

See also

 Poet laureate
 List of U.S. states' poets laureate
 United States Poet Laureate

References

 
Ohio culture
American Poets Laureate